The  is the 31st edition of the Japan Academy Film Prize, an award presented by the Nippon Academy-Sho Association to award excellence in filmmaking. It awarded the best films of 2007 and it took place on February 15, 2008 at the Grand Prince Hotel New Takanawa in Tokyo, Japan.

Nominees

Awards

References

External links 
  - 
 Complete list of awards and nominations for the 31st Japan Academy Prize - 

Japan Academy Film Prize
2008 in Japanese cinema
Japan Academy Film Prize
February 2008 events in Japan